This is an article about qualification for the 2018 Women's U19 Volleyball European Championship.

Qualification summary

Pool standing procedure
 Number of matches won
 Match points
 Sets ratio
 Points ratio
 Result of the last match between the tied teams

Match won 3–0 or 3–1: 3 match points for the winner, 0 match points for the loser
Match won 3–2: 2 match points for the winner, 1 match point for the loser

Direct qualification

Host countries, qualified for final round directly.

Qualification
The winners of each pools and the best three second placed teams qualified for final round.
Pools composition
First round

Second round

First round

Pool 1
All times are Kiev Time (UTC+02:00).
venue: Budivelnyk Sports Palace, Cherkasy, Ukraine

|}

|}

Pool 2
All times are Central European Time (UTC+01:00).
venue: Sport Center Igalo, Herceg Novi, Montenegro

|}

|}

Second round

Pool A
All times are Central European Summer Time (UTC+02:00).
venue: Sport Hall, Zrenjanin, Serbia

|}

|}

Pool B
All times are Moscow Time (UTC+03:00).
venue: Sport Hall Voleygrad, Anapa, Russia

|}

|}

 withdrew.

Pool C
All times are Central European Summer Time (UTC+02:00).
venue: Palazzetto dello Sport, Concorezzo, Italy

|}

|}

Pool D
All times are Eastern European Summer Time (UTC+03:00).
venue: Portaria Sport Hall, Volos, Greece

|}

|}

Pool E
All times are Central European Summer Time (UTC+02:00).
venue: Mestská Športová Hala, Humenné, Slovakia

|}

|}

Pool F
All times are Eastern European Summer Time (UTC+03:00).
venue: Olimpia Sports Hall, Ploiești, Romania

|}

|}

Pool G
All times are Central European Summer Time (UTC+02:00).
venue: Ballsporthalle, Vilsbiburg, Germany

|}

|}

Second round

Pool H
All times are Eastern European Summer Time (UTC+03:00).
venue: Olimpia Sports Hall, Ploiești, Romania

|}

|}

Pool I
All times are Eastern European Summer Time (UTC+03:00).
venue: Vathi Sports Hall, Samos, Greece

|}

|}

References

External links

Women's Junior European Volleyball Championship
Europe